Baradères is an arrondissement in the Nippes department of Haiti. As of 2015, the population was 47,060 inhabitants. 
Postal codes in the Baradères Arrondissement start with the number 75.

The arondissement consists of the following communes:
 Baradères
 Grand-Boucan

References

Arrondissements of Haiti
Nippes